Nick Howarth (born 24 June 1976) is an Australian middle-distance runner. He competed in the men's 1500 metres at the 2000 Summer Olympics.

References

External links
 

1976 births
Living people
Athletes (track and field) at the 2000 Summer Olympics
Australian male middle-distance runners
Olympic athletes of Australia
Place of birth missing (living people)